Swing dance is a group of social dances that developed with the swing style of jazz music in the 1920s–1940s, with the origins of each dance predating the popular "swing era". Hundreds of styles of swing dancing were developed; those that have survived beyond that era include Lindy Hop, Balboa, Collegiate Shag, and Charleston. Today, the best-known of these dances is the Lindy Hop,  which originated in Harlem in the early 1930s.  While the majority of swing dances began in African-American communities as vernacular African-American dances, some influenced swing-era dances, like Balboa, developed outside of these communities.

"Swing dance" was not commonly used to identify a group of dances until the latter half of the 20th century. Historically, the term swing referred to the style of jazz music, which inspired the evolution of the dance. Jitterbug is any form of swing dance, though it is often used as a synonym for the six-count derivative of Lindy Hop called "East Coast Swing".  It was also common to use the word to identify a kind of dancer (i.e., a swing dancer).  A "jitterbug" might prefer to dance Lindy Hop, Shag, or any of the other swing dances.  The term was famously associated with swing era band leader Cab Calloway because, as he put it, "[The dancers] look like a bunch of jitterbugs out there on the floor due to their fast, often bouncy movements."

The term "swing dancing" is often extended to include other dances that do not have certain characteristics of traditional swing dances: West Coast Swing, Carolina Shag, East Coast Swing, Hand Dancing, Jive, Rock and Roll, Modern Jive, and other dances developed during the 1940s and later.  A strong tradition of social and competitive boogie woogie and Rock 'n' Roll in Europe add these dances to their local swing dance cultures.

Original forms dating from the 1920s and early 1930s

 Lindy Hop evolved in the early 1930s. It is a dance of African American origin characterized by a high degree of physical vigor. It is characterized by an 8-count circular basic or "swing out" and has an emphasis on improvisation and the ability to easily adapt to include other steps in 8-count and 6-count rhythms. The name "Lindy Hop" is often attributed to "Shorty" George Snowden during an interaction with a newspaper writer who asked him what kind of dance they were doing. Because Charles Lindbergh had just made his famous solo flight across the Atlantic Ocean, Shorty George is said to have replied, "the Lindy Hop." Whether it was Shorty George who coined the name is disputed by some writers, but, in any case, the name stuck. The Savoy Ballroom in Harlem was the home of the Lindy Hop. As its popularity increased, professional troupes were formed. These troupes toured the United States and Europe performing versions of the Lindy Hop.
 Balboa, also known as "Bal" is an 8-count dance that is done in closed position. The earliest form of the dance (often called "Pure Balboa") evolved in the mostly conservative dance halls of southern California where space was limited and strict codes of conduct were enforced.  These dance halls usually prohibited the wild kicks of the Charleston and Lindy Hop.  Pure Balboa is characterized by an upright posture with partners standing chest to chest.  There are no spins or turns and the dancers remain in contact through the upper chest at all times. Not leaving much scope for variations, pure Balboa is an intrinsically very simple dance. The few step variations generally play with the rhythm or look and feel (style) from below the knee downwards and deal with changes in direction. Balboa is frequently danced to fast jazz (usually anything from 180 to 320 BPM ), though many like a slower (170-190 BPM) tempo. While most dancers differentiate between pure Balboa and Bal Swing, both are considered to be a part of the dance. Bal Swing evolved from Balboa when original Balboa dancers experimented with fancier variations of the dance which forced the chest to chest connection to be broken. In this form of Bal a variety of spins, turns, dips, tricks, and even air steps are introduced. These improvisations are permissible provided the overall style and framework remain true in spirit to the original dance and are combined with original Balboa footwork.
 Collegiate Shag (or "Shag") is done primarily to uptempo swing and sometimes pre-swing jazz music (185-200+ BPM). It is believed that the dance originated in the Carolinas in the 1920s, later spreading across the United States during the 1930s. The shag is still danced today by swing dance enthusiasts worldwide. Shag is believed to have been the first and most popular swing dance of the original swing era
 Lindy Charleston is very similar to the original Charleston of the 1920s, only the pulse of the dance is lowered (the up-and-down motion in the pulse emphasizes the downward movement) to match that of the Lindy Hop.  This form of Charleston includes a number of positions, including side-by-side, hand-to-hand, and tandem.  In "jockey position", the closed position is opened out so that both partners may face forward, without breaking apart.  In side-by-side Charleston, partners open the closed position entirely, so that their only points of connection are at their touching hips and arm contact, wherein the leader's right hand and arm touch the follower's back and the follower's left hand and arm touch the leader's shoulder and arm.  Both partners then swing their free arms as they would in solo Charleston. In both jockey and side-by-side Charleston, the leader steps back onto their left foot, while the follower steps back onto their right. In tandem Charleston, one partner stands in front of the other (usually the follower, though the arrangement may vary), both face in the same direction to start, and both begin by stepping back onto the left foot.  The partner behind holds the front partner's hands, and their joined arms swing backwards and forwards, as in the basic step.

Forms dating from the late 1930s and early 1940s

St. Louis shag (or "Shag") is a dance that evolved out of the Charleston. As its name suggests, it is recognized as having started in St. Louis, Missouri. St. Louis Shag features a stationary 8-count basic that is most commonly composed of triple-step, kick, triple-step, kick. It is a very fast closed position dance that is usually done to stomp, jump, and boogie-woogie music.

 Big Apple is both a partner dance and a "called" circle dance that originated in the Afro-American community of the United States in the beginning of the 20th century.  The dance that eventually became known as the Big Apple is speculated to have been created in the early 1930s by African-American youth dancing at the Big Apple Club, which was at the former House of Peace Synagogue on Park Street in Columbia, South Carolina.  The synagogue was converted into a black juke joint called the "Big Apple Night Club".
 Little Apple This dance was a partnered version of the Big Apple, which is also believed to have originated in the Carolinas of the Southern United States.

Derivatives of swing dance from the 1940s and 1950s

 East Coast Swing is a simpler 6-count variation that spawned from the six-count variations of the Lindy Hop.  It evolved with swing-band music of the 1940s and the work of the Arthur Murray dance studios in the 1940s. It is also known as Six-count Swing, Triple-Step Swing, or Single-Time Swing.  East Coast Swing has very simple structure and footwork along with basic moves and styling. It is popular for its simple nature and is often danced to slow, medium, or fast tempo jazz, blues, or rock and roll.  Occasionally, Rockabilly, aka Rock-a-billy, is mistaken for East Coast Swing, but Rockabilly is more closely related to Western Swing.
 West Coast Swing was developed in the 1940s, as a stylistic variation on the Los Angeles style of the Lindy Hop. It is a slotted dance and is done to a wide variety of music including: blues, rock and roll, country western, pop, hip hop, smooth, cool jazz, R& B, and funk music.
 Western Swing has long been the name for jazz-influenced western music of the 1940s and, by extension, two-step, line dancing or swing dance done to such music. Contemporary 21st century Country Swing  or dancing or "Country Western Swing Dancing"  (C/W Swing) has a distinct culture, with classes and instructional videos on YouTube and DVD teaching dips, lifts, aerials and flips. It adds variations from other country dances, swing styles, salsa and more. As the name suggests, it is most often danced to country and western music.
 Boogie-woogie developed originally in the 1940s, with the rise of boogie woogie music. It is popular today in Europe, and was considered by some to be the European counterpart to East Coast Swing, a 6-count dance standardized for the American ballroom industry. It is danced to rock music of various kinds, blues or boogie woogie music but usually not to jazz. As the dance has developed, it has also taken to 8-count variations and swing outs similar to Lindy Hop, while keeping the original boogie woogie footwork.
 Carolina Shag was danced along the strands between Myrtle Beach, South Carolina, and Wilmington, North Carolina, during the 1940s but, during the 1990s and later, has expanded to many other places. It is most often associated with beach music, which refers to songs that are rhythm-and-blues-based and, according to Bo Bryan, a noted shag historian and resident of Beaufort County, is a term that was coined at Carolina Beach, North Carolina.
 Imperial Swing is a cross between East Coast and West Coast Swing as it is done in slot and in the round. It started at the Club Imperial in St Louis. George Edick, who owned the club, let teenagers dance on the lower level and the swing dancers of the time taught them what was learned from their trips to the east coast. As people traveled around, they added parts of west coast, bop and Carolina shag to complement the dance and make it distinctive. "The Imperial" has elements of "East Coast", "West Coast", "Carolina Shag" and "Bop".
 Jive is a dance of International Style Ballroom dancing. It is a very upbeat dance in which the performers look to be hopping off the ground. It initially was based on Eastern swing taken to England by American Troops in World War II and evolved before becoming the now standardized form of today.
 Skip Jive is a British variant of the Jive, popular in the 1950s and 1960s, danced to trad jazz.
 Modern Jive (also known as LeRoc and Ceroc©) developed in the 1980s, reputedly from a French form of Jive.  Modern Jive is not technically of the Jive family, which typically use a 6-count pattern of various combinations of walking and triple steps (Ballroom Jive - back/replace triple-triple; Swing Jive - triple-triple back/replace), etc.  It is pared down to a simple box step and concentrates on the simpler forms of couple dance styling, gauged to provide a social atmosphere rather than technical aptitude. There are debates about whether it is a form of swing dancing due to lack of syncopations, rhythmic footwork variations, a static partner dynamic, and lack of swinging music, amongst the swing community at large, but they do consider themselves a style of swing.
 Rock and Roll - Developing in the 1950s in response to rock and roll music, rock-and-roll is very popular in Australia and danced socially as well as competitively and in performances. The style has a long association with Lindy Hop in that country, as many of the earliest Lindy Hoppers in the early 1990s moved to Lindy Hop from a rock-and-roll tradition. There are ongoing debates about whether rock-and-roll constitutes swing dancing, particularly in reference to the music to which it is danced: there is some debate as to whether or not it swings. 
 Acrobatic Rock'n'Roll – Popular in Europe, acrobatic rock'n'roll is popularly associated with Russian gymnasts who took up the dance, though it is popular throughout Europe today. It is a performance dance and sport rather than a social dance, though there are people who remove the acrobatic stunts to dance it on a social level.
 Washington Hand Dancing originated around Washington, DC in the mid-1950s,  and a new generation of dancers started innovating and dancing to Motown music. From its very beginning, DC Hand-dance was referred to and called “DC Hand-Dance/Hand-Dancing”, “DC Swing”, “DC Style” (swing) and “fast dance” (meaning DC Hand-Dance).  This is the first time a version of “swing” dance was termed “hand-dance/hand-dancing”.  DC Hand-Dance is characterized by very smooth footwork and movements, and close-in and intricate hand-turns, danced to a 6-beat, 6-count dance rhythm.  The more modern footwork consists of smooth and continuous floor contact, sliding and gliding-type steps versus hopping and jumping-type steps of the older style which stylistically still held elements of its Jitterbug/Lindy Hop roots, and there are no aerials.
 Push and Whip are Texas forms of swing dance developed in the 1940s and 1950s.  They are slotted swing dances, danced to a wide variety of music including blues, pop, jazz, and rock and roll.  Similar to West Coast Swing, they emphasize the closed position, double resistance/rock step, and lead-follow and also incorporate intricate arm work.  Slow Whip is a variation on Whip/Push that is danced to slow blues music, typically 60 BPM or slower.

Swing dancing today

Swing dancing was most popular in the 1930s and 1940s, but it still continues today. Dance moves have evolved with the music. Swing dancing styles are the foundation of many other dance styles including disco, country line dancing, and hip hop.  Swing dancing clubs and contests are still held around the world.

Competition

Levels
In West Coast Swing the competitions are divided into sections by level of experience.
The levels are Newcomer, Novice, Intermediate, Advanced and All-Star. There is no official system in the United States to ensure that couples dance at the appropriate level of experience. The World Swing Dance Council holds a Registry of all points attained at different levels of competition.

There is no points system for the majority of Lindy Hop competitions.

Judging criteria
Swing dancing falls under the American Rhythm category. There are several different categories at competitions depending on what type of dance you do.

Judging for competition is based on the three "T's" as well as showmanship.

Heats
Most competition dance floors can only hold about 12 couples dancing at a time. If the number of participants is larger than what the floor can hold, the competition will hold qualifying rounds. Once they get to 24 couples there will then be the quarterfinal round (2 separate rounds of about 12 each), then the semifinal (1 round of about 12), and finally the final round (1 round, usually 6 or 7 couples).

See also 

 Frankie Manning
 Norma Miller
 Lindy Hop today
 Hollywood-style Lindy Hop
 Savoy-style Lindy Hop
 Lindy Exchange
 Charleston
 Balboa (dance)
 Swing Rueda
 West Coast Swing
 Herräng Dance Camp

References

External links

 DanceCal.com - DanceCal, a list of Swing camps and weekend events
 NASDE.com - National Association of Swing Dance Events
 SwingDanceCouncil.com - World Swing Dance Council WSDC

Ballroom dance
Competitive dance
Dancesport
Social dance
 
Articles containing video clips